Spacecake is a 1999 album by the electronic group PlatEAU. The album peaked at number 24 on the CMJ RPM Charts in the U.S.

Track listing
 "Jack Herrer" – 4:37
 "Nam" - 5:12
 "Blueberry" – 3:35
 "Nocruisin" – 3:46
 "Super Silver Haze" – 5:54
 "The Search" – 2:12
 "K2" – 2:40
 "De Fog" – 6:48
 "Phuket" – 4:31
 "Creature" – 5:56
 "Spacecake" – 3:31
 "Bon Bon Bient" – 2:43
 "Creeper" – 3:25
 "30 Daze" – 6:56
 "Satchel" – 3:39
 "On the Plat" – 3:38

Personnel
Phil Western
cEvin Key
Tim Hill (electronics - 6, 7, 9, 12, 15)
kaRIN (guest voices - 5, 10)

Notes
The track "Nocruisin", while credited to PlatEAU, is actually a solo piece composed by Philth.

References

1999 albums
PlatEAU albums